The 1974–75 season was the 63rd season in Hajduk Split’s history and their 28th season in the Yugoslav First League. Their 8th place finish in the 1972–73 season meant it was their 28th successive season playing in the Yugoslav First League.

Competitions

Overall

Yugoslav First League

Classification

Matches

First League

Source: hajduk.hr

Yugoslav Cup

Sources: hajduk.hr

Player seasonal records

Top scorers

Source: Competitive matches

See also
1973–74 Yugoslav First League
1973 Yugoslav Cup

External sources
 1973–74 Yugoslav First League at rsssf.com
 1973 Yugoslav Cup at rsssf.com

HNK Hajduk Split seasons
Hajduk Split
Yugoslav football championship-winning seasons